Coelorinchus is a genus of rattail fish.

The name derives from Greek κοῖλος (koilos, "hollow") and ῥύγχος (rhynchos, "snout").

Species
There are currently 121 recognized species in this genus:

 Coelorinchus acanthiger Barnard, 1925 (Surgeon grenadier)
 Coelorinchus acantholepis C. H. Gilbert & C. L. Hubbs, 1920
 Coelorinchus aconcagua Iwamoto, 1978 (Aconcagua grenadier)
 Coelorinchus acutirostris H. M. Smith & Radcliffe, 1912 (Spear-nose whiptail)
 Coelorinchus amirantensis Iwamoto, Golani, Baranes & Goren, 2006
 Coelorinchus amydrozosterus Iwamoto & A. Williams, 1999 (Faint-banded whiptail)
 Coelorinchus anatirostris D. S. Jordan & C. H. Gilbert, 1904 (Duck-bill grenadier)
 Coelorinchus anisacanthus Sazonov, 1994
 Coelorinchus aratrum C. H. Gilbert, 1905
 Coelorinchus argentatus H. M. Smith & Radcliffe, 1912 (Silver whiptail)
 Coelorinchus argus M. C. W. Weber, 1913 (Eye-spot grenadier)
 Coelorinchus aspercephalus Waite, 1911 (Rough-head whiptail)
 Coelorinchus asteroides Okamura, 1963
 Coelorinchus australis (J. Richardson, 1839) (Javelin rattail)
 Coelorinchus biclinozonalis T. Arai & P. J. McMillan, 1982 (Two-barred whiptail)
 Coelorinchus bollonsi McCann & D. G. McKnight, 1980 (Bollons' rattail)
 Coelorinchus braueri Barnard, 1925 (Shovel-nose grenadier)
 Coelorinchus brevirostris Okamura, 1984
 Coelorinchus caelorhincus (A. Risso, 1810) (Hollow-snout grenadier)
 Coelorinchus campbellicus McCann & D. G. McKnight, 1980
 Coelorinchus canus (Garman, 1899) (Clear-snout grenadier)
 Coelorinchus caribbaeus (Goode & T. H. Bean, 1885) (Black-fin grenadier)
 Coelorinchus carinifer C. H. Gilbert & C. L. Hubbs, 1920
 Coelorinchus caudani (Koehler, 1896)
 Coelorinchus celaenostomus P. J. McMillan & Paulin, 1993 (Black-lip rattail)
 Coelorinchus charius Iwamoto & A. Williams, 1999 (Graceful whiptail)
 Coelorinchus chilensis C. H. Gilbert & W. F. Thompson, 1916 (Chilean grenadier)
 Coelorinchus cingulatus C. H. Gilbert & C. L. Hubbs, 1920
 Coelorinchus commutabilis H. M. Smith & Radcliffe, 1912
 Coelorinchus cookianus McCann & D. G. McKnight, 1980 (Cook's rattail)
 Coelorinchus cylindricus Iwamoto & Merrett, 1997
 Coelorinchus denticulatus Regan, 1921 (File-snout grenadier)
 Coelorinchus divergens Okamura & Yato, 1984
 Coelorinchus dorsalis C. H. Gilbert & C. L. Hubbs, 1920
 Coelorinchus doryssus C. H. Gilbert, 1905
 Coelorinchus fasciatus (Günther, 1878) (Banded whiptail)
 Coelorinchus flabellispinnis  (Alcock, 1894)
 Coelorinchus formosanus Okamura, 1963 (Formosa grenadier)
 Coelorinchus fuscigulus Iwamoto, H. C. Ho & K. T. Shao, 2009 
 Coelorinchus gaesorhynchus Iwamoto & A. Williams, 1999 (Javelin whiptail)
 Coelorinchus geronimo N. B. Marshall & Iwamoto, 1973
 Coelorinchus gilberti D. S. Jordan & C. L. Hubbs, 1925
 Coelorinchus gladius C. H. Gilbert & Cramer, 1897
 Coelorinchus goobala Iwamoto & A. Williams, 1999 (Goobala whiptail)
 Coelorinchus gormani Iwamoto & K. J. Graham, 2008
 Coelorinchus hexafasciatus Okamura, 1982 (Six-band grenadier)
 Coelorinchus hige Matsubara, 1943
 Coelorinchus hoangi Iwamoto & K. J. Graham, 2008
 Coelorinchus horribilis P. J. McMillan & Paulin, 1993 (Horrible rattail)
 Coelorinchus hubbsi Matsubara, 1936
 Coelorinchus immaculatus Sazonov & Iwamoto, 1992
 Coelorinchus infuscus P. J. McMillan & Paulin, 1993 (Dusky rattail)
 Coelorinchus innotabilis McCulloch, 1907 (Notable rattail)
 Coelorinchus japonicus (Temminck & Schlegel, 1846) (Japanese grenadier)
 Coelorinchus jordani H. M. Smith & T. E. B. Pope, 1906
 Coelorinchus kaiyomaru T. Arai & Iwamoto, 1979 (Campbell's whiptail)
 Coelorinchus kamoharai Matsubara, 1943 (Kamohara's grenadier)
 Coelorinchus karrerae Trunov, 1984 (Karrer's whiptail)
 Coelorinchus kermadecus D. S. Jordan & C. H. Gilbert, 1904 (Kermadec rattail)
 Coelorinchus kishinouyei D. S. Jordan & Snyder, 1900 (Mugura grenadier)
 Coelorinchus labiatus (Koehler, 1896) (Spear-snouted grenadier)
 Coelorinchus lasti Iwamoto & A. Williams, 1999 (Rough-snout whiptail)
 Coelorinchus leptorhinus M. L. Chiou, K. T. Shao & Iwamoto, 2004
 Coelorinchus longissimus Matsubara, 1943
 Coelorinchus macrochir (Günther, 1877) (Long-arm grenadier)
 Coelorinchus macrolepis C. H. Gilbert & C. L. Hubbs, 1920
 Coelorinchus macrorhynchus H. M. Smith & Radcliffe, 1912 (Big-snout whiptail)
 Coelorinchus maculatus C. H. Gilbert & C. L. Hubbs, 1920 (Blotch whiptail)
 Coelorinchus marinii C. L. Hubbs, 1934 (Marini's grenadier)
 Coelorinchus matamua (McCann & D. G. McKnight, 1980) (Mahia whiptail)
 Coelorinchus matsubarai Okamura, 1982
 Coelorinchus maurofasciatus P. J. McMillan & Paulin, 1993 (Dark-banded rattail)
 Coelorinchus mayiae Iwamoto & A. Williams, 1999 (False silver whiptail)
 Coelorinchus mediterraneus Iwamoto & Ungaro, 2002
 Coelorinchus melanobranchus Iwamoto & Merrett, 1997
 Coelorinchus melanosagmatus Iwamoto & M. E. Anderson, 1999
 Coelorinchus mirus McCulloch, 1926 (Gargoyle fish)
 Coelorinchus multifasciatus Sazonov & Iwamoto, 1992
 Coelorinchus multispinulosus Katayama, 1942 (Spear-nose grenadier)
 Coelorinchus mycterismus P. J. McMillan & Paulin, 1993 (Upturned-snout rattail)
 Coelorinchus mystax P. J. McMillan & Paulin, 1993 (Patterned rattail)
 Coelorinchus nazcaensis Sazonov & Iwamoto, 1992
 Coelorinchus notatus H. M. Smith & Radcliffe, 1912
 Coelorinchus obscuratus P. J. McMillan & Iwamoto, 2009 
 Coelorinchus occa (Goode & T. H. Bean, 1885) (Sword-snout grenadier)
 Coelorinchus oliverianus Phillipps, 1927 (Hawk-nose grenadier)
 Coelorinchus osipullus P. J. McMillan & Iwamoto, 2009 
 Coelorinchus parallelus (Günther, 1877) (Spiny grenadier)
 Coelorinchus pardus Iwamoto & A. Williams, 1999 (Leopard whiptail)
 Coelorinchus parvifasciatus P. J. McMillan & Paulin, 1993 (Small-banded rattail)
 Coelorinchus platorhynchus H. M. Smith & Radcliffe, 1912
 Coelorinchus polli N. B. Marshall & Iwamoto, 1973
 Coelorinchus productus C. H. Gilbert & C. L. Hubbs, 1916 (Unicorn grenadier)
 Coelorinchus pseudoparallelus Trunov, 1983
 Coelorinchus quadricristatus (Alcock, 1891)
 Coelorinchus quincunciatus C. H. Gilbert & C. L. Hubbs, 1920
 Coelorinchus radcliffei C. H. Gilbert & C. L. Hubbs, 1920
 Coelorinchus scaphopsis (C. H. Gilbert, 1890) (Shoulder-spot grenadier)
 Coelorinchus semaphoreus Iwamoto & Merrett, 1997 (Semaphore whiptail)
 Coelorinchus sereti Iwamoto & Merrett, 1997 (Short-tooth whiptail)
 Coelorinchus sexradiatus C. H. Gilbert & C. L. Hubbs, 1920
 Coelorinchus shcherbachevi Iwamoto & Merrett, 1997 (False duckbill whiptail)
 Coelorinchus sheni M. L. Chiou, K. T. Shao & Iwamoto, 2004
 Coelorinchus simorhynchus Iwamoto & M. E. Anderson, 1994
 Coelorinchus smithi C. H. Gilbert & C. L. Hubbs, 1920 (False graceful whiptail)
 Coelorinchus sparsilepis Okamura, 1984
 Coelorinchus spathulatus P. J. McMillan & Paulin, 1993 (Spatulate rattail)
 Coelorinchus spilonotus Sazonov & Iwamoto, 1992
 Coelorinchus spinifer C. H. Gilbert & C. L. Hubbs, 1920
 Coelorinchus supernasutus P. J. McMillan & Paulin, 1993 (Supa-nose rattail)
 Coelorinchus thompsoni C. H. Gilbert & C. L. Hubbs, 1920
 Coelorinchus thurla Iwamoto & A. Williams, 1999 (Thurla whiptail)
 Coelorinchus tokiensis (Steindachner & Döderlein, 1887) 
 Coelorinchus trachycarus Iwamoto, P. J. McMillan & Shcherbachev, 1999
 Coelorinchus triocellatus C. H. Gilbert & C. L. Hubbs, 1920
 Coelorinchus trunovi Iwamoto & M. E. Anderson, 1994
 Coelorinchus velifer C. H. Gilbert & C. L. Hubbs, 1920
 Coelorinchus ventrilux N. B. Marshall & Iwamoto, 1973 (Fire-belly grenadier)
 Coelorinchus vityazae Iwamoto, Y. N. Shcherbachev & Marquardt, 2004
 Coelorinchus weberi C. H. Gilbert & C. L. Hubbs, 1920
 Coelorinchus yurii Iwamoto, Golani, Baranes & Goren, 2006

References

Macrouridae
Deep sea fish